The 2nd constituency of Doubs (French: Deuxième circonscription du Doubs) is one of five electoral districts in the department of the same name, each of which returns one deputy to the French National Assembly in elections using the two-round system, with a run-off if no candidate receives more than 50% of the vote in the first round.

Description
The constituency is made up of the six former cantons of Besançon Est, Besançon Nord-Est, Besançon Sud, Marchaux, Ornans, and Roulans.

At the time of the 1999 census (which was the basis for the most recent redrawing of constituency boundaries, carried out in 2010) the 2nd constituency had a total population of 105,622.

Since 1988 the seat has usually swung back-and-forth between left and right and was first won by Éric Alauzet of The Greens by the tiny margin of 108 votes in the 2012 election. Alauzet moved to La République En Marche! for the 2017 election.

Historic representation

Election results

2022

 
 
|-
| colspan="8" bgcolor="#E9E9E9"|
|-

2017

2012

Notes and references

Official results of French elections from 2002 taken from "Résultats électoraux officiels en France" (in French).

2